Gordon Donaldson,  (13 April 1913 – 16 March 1993) was a Scottish historian.

Life

He was born in a tenement at 140 McDonald Road off Leith Walk in northern Edinburgh on 13 April 1913 the son of Rachel Swan and Magnus Donaldson.

He was of Shetland descent. Donaldson attended Broughton Elementary School (adjacent to his home) and then the Royal High School of Edinburgh (1921–31), before being awarded a scholarship to study at the University of Edinburgh. He also supplemented his income by undertaking some tutoring. After graduating in 1935 with a first-class Honours Degree in History (MA), he gained his PhD in 1938 at the Institute of Historical Research in London, where he also won the David Berry Prize from the Royal Historical Society. Donaldson also has a DLitt degree.

After working as an archivist at the General Register Office for Scotland 1938–1947, he was appointed to a lectureship in Scottish History at the University of Edinburgh, largely through the offices of William Croft Dickinson. This marked the beginning of Donaldson's 32-year academic career at the University.

He served as a Reader from 1955, before succeeding Dickinson as Sir William Fraser Professor of Scottish History and Palaeography in 1963, which he held until his retirement in 1979. During his academic career, Professor Donaldson wrote or co-wrote over thirty books, and numerous articles and addresses. He also served at various times as President of the Scottish Ecclesiological Society, the Scottish Church History Society, the Scottish History Society, the Scottish Record Society, the Scottish Records Association, and the Stair Society.

In 1978 he was elected a Fellow of the Royal Society of Edinburgh. His proposers were Norman Gash, Geoffrey Barrow, Sir Fraser Noble, and John Cameron, Lord Cameron.

He was also an Honorary Vice-President of the Royal Historical Society, and in 1992 he received the St Olav's Medal from the King of Norway. When Professor Donaldson retired, he was appointed Historiographer Royal in Scotland.

He could talk about any character in Scottish history as if he knew them personally. It was his love of the sea and ships, born from his childhood in Shetland, that took him to Dysart in Fife in his retirement, where he lived in a 17th-century Pan Ha' apartment. "I cannot pass my old age without the sight of the sea and ships," he said.

He died in Windygates in Fife on 16 March 1993. He never married and left no family.

Bibliography 
 (with James Kirk) Scotland's history : approaches and reflections, 1995
 A Northern Commonwealth: Scotland and Norway, 1990
 The faith of the Scots, 1990
 (with David John Breeze) A queen's progress : an introduction to the buildings associated with Mary Queen of Scots in the care of the Secretary of State for Scotland, 1987
 Scottish church history, 1985
 All the Queen's men : power and politics in Mary Stewart's Scotland, 1983
 Four centuries : Edinburgh University life, 1583–1983, 1983
 (with Ann Morton) British National Archives and the local historian : a guide to official record publications, 1980
 (with Robert Morpeth) A dictionary of Scottish history, 1977
 Scotland : the shaping of a nation, 1974
 Mary, Queen of Scots, 1974
 (with Robert Morpeth) Who's who in Scottish history, 1973
 Scottish historical documents, 1970
 The first trial of Mary, Queen of Scots, 1969
 The memoirs of Sir James Melville of Halhill...., 1969
 Scottish Kings, 1967
 The Scots overseas, 1966
 General Editor, The Edinburgh History of Scotland, 1965
 Vol I, Scotland: The making of the Kingdom, A.A.M. Duncan
 Vol II, Scotland: The Later Middle Ages, R. Nicholson
 Vol III, Scotland: James V to James VII, G. Donaldson
 Vol IV, Scotland: 1689 to the Present, W Ferguson
 Scotland: James V to James VII, 1965
 Scotland: church and nation through sixteen centuries, 1960
 The Scottish Reformation, 1960
 Shetland Life under Earl Patrick, 1958
 Common errors in Scottish history, 1956
 The making of the Scottish prayer book of 1637, 1954
 The Court Book of Shetland 1602–1604, 1954
 Accounts of the collectors of thirds of benefices, 1561–1572, 1949
 (with John Lauder, C Macrae) St. Andrews formulare, 1514–1546, 1944

References

1913 births
1993 deaths
20th-century Scottish historians
People from Leith
Alumni of the University of Edinburgh
Commanders of the Order of the British Empire
Fellows of the British Academy
Fellows of the Royal Historical Society
Scottish archivists